Milan Trněný (born 6 March 1971) is a Czech former professional tennis player.

Trneny, who had a best singles ranking of 471, featured in the 1991 Prague Open main draw, losing his first round match in three sets to Dimitri Poliakov. His best doubles ranking was 264 and he made one ATP Challenger doubles final.

ATP Challenger finals

Doubles: 1 (0–1)

References

External links
 
 

1971 births
Living people
Czech male tennis players
Czechoslovak male tennis players